"I Stand Here Ironing" is a short story by Tillie Olsen. It was published in her short story collection Tell Me a Riddle in 1956.

Plot introduction
The story is told from a mother's first person point of view. The narrator, a remarried mother of five children, remembers the way she parented her first child, Emily. Her thoughts, and the story, are about what she would have done differently while parenting Emily if she had been more experienced and had better options. It is one of Olsen's most anthologized works.

The story is about guilt — guilt that will be developed during the narration of the whole story. The mother is standing there ironing and within the next 30 minutes she will recall the whole trip of her and her daughter's life. Trying to find an answer for what she can do now when it is too late. Her feeling that her daughter can claim her responsible for her suffering was the main idea in this short story.

Setting
The story moves through a fairly long timeframe; although it is set in the early 1950s, it looks back to the 1930s (the time of the Great Depression), and the 1940s (the time of the Second World War). The story is set in the working class home of the narrator, who comments that when her first child was born. She states that they "were poor and could not afford for her the soil of easy growth."

Plot summary
A mother is contacted by an unnamed "you"—a guidance counselor at her daughter's school or a teacher—informing her that her daughter is in trouble.  While she irons, the mother works through her response to the summons, and has flashbacks to her daughter's childhood. Some of the things that the mother remembers in Emily's past include:
Emily's mother nursed her, but followed the dictates of the "books then" in breastfeeding at an appointed hour, not when the infant cried to be fed.
Her father left her when she was only eight months old; 
Her mother worked for the first six years of Emily's life;
Emily was sent away to live with relatives because her mother could not work and take care of her at the same time;
Emily was sent away to a convalescent home where she was deeply unhappy.
Emily was overshadowed by her sister, Susan.

Though Emily's upbringing leaves her guarded and independent, in high school she discovers her talent as a comedian, and her happiness and success warms her relationship with her mother. In the story's end, the mother declines to visit the counselor, refusing to "total it all," or to submit data about Emily's childhood into a formula. Instead she wishes that the counselor will "let her be," but also to help Emily understand her own agency in determining her future, metaphorically speaking, "that she is more than this dress on the ironing board, helpless before the iron."

Characters
Emily — A shy nineteen-year-old girl. She is the oldest of five children.  Emily had a very difficult childhood, but has recently developed a talent for comedic acting. She is cynical about life and the world, despite her youth.  She believes the atomic bomb will soon destroy everything; so there is no point in caring about anything.
Emily's father — deserted the family so as to not "share poverty with them" less than one year after Emily's birth.
Emily's mother — A mother who is filled with regrets and worries about her daughter. She worked hard to support her family and take care of them, but in retrospect, she realizes there are many things she would have done differently if she could.
Emily's stepfather — called away to fight in World War II.
Susan — the second child, golden and curly haired, chubby, quick, articulate and sure.  By the time Susan was born, her mother had remarried and gained enough experience to show more affection than when Emily was born.

Literary Devices

Metaphor
One of the story's central metaphors is established in the opening line:I stand here ironing, and what you asked me moves tormented back and forth with the iron.  As the narrator irons her daughter (Emily)'s dress, she is also "ironing out" her daughter's path and problems. The act of ironing signifies smoothness and thus her hope for Emily to have a smooth life; though she is prevented from taking steps to achieve this goal. The word "tormented" suggests her sense of guilt for her lack of attention and care devoted toward Emily, thus causing the various problems her daughter faces. Meanwhile, while recounting the past, she falls back on the act of ironing and other endless chores for her defense, suggesting that, though guilty for her shortcomings as a mother, she can do nothing about it due to her never-ending cycle of domestic duties.

References

Bibliography

1961 short stories
American short stories
Jewish American literature